Pump.io (pronounced "pump eye-oh") is a general-purpose activity streams engine that can be used as a federated social networking protocol which "does most of what people really want from a social network". Started by Evan Prodromou, it is a follow-up to StatusNet; Identi.ca, which was the largest StatusNet service, switched to pump.io in June 2013.

Technology 
Designed to be much more lightweight and efficient than its StatusNet predecessor, Pump.io is written in Node.js and uses Activity Streams as the format for commands and to transfer data via a simple REST inbox API.

Pump.io requires:
 node.js
 npm
 a database server (typically NoSQL databases such as MongoDB or Redis, though there are other options through the database abstraction layer called Databank)
 GraphicsMagick with the `gm` command

Pump.io can run easily on low-resource hardware (such as a Raspberry Pi or BeagleBone Black). It can be used via the Web UI, or other clients via the API.

Federation 
As a distributed social network, Pump.io is not tied to a single site. Users across servers can subscribe to each other, and if one or more individual nodes go offline the rest of the network remains intact.

Limitations and issues 
Features that were present in StatusNet are still (as of October 2017) not implemented in Pump.io, such as Groups, hashtags, and page listing popular posts.

Standardization 

The W3C Federated Social Web Working Group, launched in July 2014, has produced the ActivityPub standard, based on the protocols used in pump.io as a likely successor to OStatus. It was officially published as a Recommendation on 23 January 2018.

See also 
 Comparison of software and protocols for distributed social networking

References

External links 
 Pump.io homepage

Free software programmed in JavaScript
Social networking services
Web applications
Microblogging software
Distributed computing